Nevertire is a closed railway station on the Main West railway line in New South Wales, Australia which served the small township of Nevertire. The station opened in 1883 and is now closed to passenger services. A large wheat loading facility and silo and the junction of the Warren branch-line are located at Nevertire. The station is approximately 563.700km from Sydney.

References

Disused regional railway stations in New South Wales
Railway stations in Australia opened in 1883
Main Western railway line, New South Wales